St. Kizito Vocational Training Institute is a Catholic-based training institute headquartered at Githurai Kimbo, 20.8 kilometers from Nairobi. The institute provides job training  to young people in a bid to address their primary needs in a socio-economic context. Fraught with unemployment challenges compounded with unbalanced and vertiginous population growth, there is an urgent need of educational opportunities in the technical field. Thus, through intervention, development, educational, and improvement approaches, St. Kizito aims to bridge the niche in the labor market by creating a pool of diverse talents. St. Kizito is an Institute of Technology & Examination Centre registered by the Government - Registration No. MOEST/PC/886/04.

References 

Universities and colleges in Kenya